Colias felderi is a butterfly in the family Pieridae. It is found in Tibet and China.

Description
Colias felderi is light orange red with a black margin, which is traversed by the yellow veins at the apex of the wing, and with a black middle spot. The hindwing has a yellowish band before the black distal margin. The underside, which has nothing distinctive, is without submarginal spots.

Taxonomy
Originally described as Colias species felderi Grum-Grshimailo, 1891 "in regione Amdo dicta, in montibus ad Sinin". It was accepted as a species by Josef Grieshuber & Gerardo Lamas.

Etymology
The name honours Rudolf Felder.

References

Grieshuber, J., Churkin, S., Worthy, B. & Lvovsky, A., (2004). The types of Colias felderi Grum-Grshimailo, 1891, Colias lada Grum-Grshimailo, 1891 and Colias sifanica Grum-Grshimailo, 1891, with additional notes on the types of Colias diva Grum-Grshimailo, 1891 (Lepidoptera: Pieridae).Helios V: 10-24, pl. 1, figs. 1-7.

Butterflies described in 1891
felderi
Butterflies of Asia